965 was a year.

965 may also refer to:

 965th Airborne Air Control Squadron
 965 Angelica

See also
 List of highways numbered 965